Earnshaw Glacier is a glacier  long, flowing northward to the east of Norwood Scarp and entering Maitland Glacier to the south of Werner Peak, in the eastern Antarctic Peninsula. It was photographed from the air by the United States Antarctic Service on September 28, 1940. It was surveyed by the Falkland Islands Dependencies Survey in January 1961, and was named by the UK Antarctic Place-Names Committee after Thomas Earnshaw, an English watchmaker who made innovations leading to the modern marine chronometer.

References 

Glaciers of Graham Land
Bowman Coast